Rosedale Manor Bed and Breakfast (commonly known as Rosedale Manor) is a bed and breakfast located in Placentia, Newfoundland and Labrador, Canada. Built in 1893, it is a top historic tourist destination in the Placentia area.

History 
Harry Verran was a mining engineer from Cornwall, England who came to Newfoundland in 1857 to work for the American entrepreneur Cyrus Field. He built the house in 1893, and married Mary Sweetman, a descendant of the popular Saunders and Sweetman firm local to Placentia. The house was owned by Verran family until 1972 before it was sold to the town of Placentia. It was bought and renovated in 1989, saving it from demolition, and then opened to the public as Rosedale Manor B&B. The old roses in the garden come from soil transported as ballast in a ship from Ireland.

Description 
The house has four bedrooms, all with period decor, antique furniture, and host Christopher Newhook's original artwork. There is a common living room area, a dining room, an English style flower garden and a koi fish pond. The house incorporates a second empire style of architecture, which was very common in Newfoundland after the great fire of St. John's in 1892. Its distinguishing features are highly decorated hooded dormer windows, ground floor bay windows and door openings with a mansard roof.

Recognition 
Due to the rich history of the site and building, it was designated as a Registered Heritage Structure of Newfoundland and Labrador in 2000. It was one of three structures to receive this status in Placentia, the other two being the St. Luke's Cultural Heritage Centre and the O'Reilly House Museum.

The Rosedale Manor was one of the recipients of the 2022 Wild Rose Recognition Award given by the Town of Placentia. The award honours those who have contributed to beautification, maintenance and gardening projects on private property or public spaces, community clean up or environmental projects.

References

External links
 rosedalemanor.ca
 Instagram page
 Facebook page

Bed and breakfasts
Buildings and structures in Newfoundland and Labrador
Buildings and structures completed in 1893